Pirosmani (translit. Pirosmani) is a 1969 Georgian biographical art-drama film directed by Giorgi Shengelaia, about Georgian primitivst painter Niko Pirosmani.

Cast
 Avto Varazi as Niko Pirosmani
 Zurab Kapianidze 
 Dodo Abashidze 
 Spartak Bagashvili 
 Kote Daushvili 
 Boris Tsipuria 
 Givi Aleksandria

Prizes and awards 
 1973 : Sutherland Trophy at BFI London Film Festival
 1974 : Grand Prize: Gold Hugo at Chicago International Film Festival
 1974 : Prize for Best Biographical film at Asolo Art Film Festival

References

External links

1969 films
1969 drama films
Georgian-language films
Films directed by Giorgi Shengelaia
1960s avant-garde and experimental films
Drama films from Georgia (country)